The Rural Municipality of Lake Lenore No. 399 is a rural municipality (RM) in the Canadian province of Saskatchewan within Census Division No. 15 and  Division No. 5.

History 
The RM of Lake Lenore No. 399 incorporated as a rural municipality on January 1, 1913.

Geography

Communities and localities 
The following urban municipalities are surrounded by the RM.

Villages
 St. Brieux

The following unincorporated communities are within the RM.

Localities
 Daylesford
 St. James

Demographics 

Attractions 
 Lenore Lake
 St. Brieux Regional Park
 St. Brieux Museum

Government 
The RM of Lake Lenore No. 399 is governed by an elected municipal council and an appointed administrator that meets on the second Wednesday of every month. The reeve of the RM is Jean Kernaleguen while its administrator is Jolynne Gallays. The RM's office is located in St. Brieux.

Transportation 
 Saskatchewan Highway 368
 Saskatchewan Highway 773
 Saskatchewan Highway 777
 Canadian National Railway

See also 
List of rural municipalities in Saskatchewan

References 

Lake Lenore

Division No. 15, Saskatchewan